Thousand Islands constitute an archipelago that straddles the Canada-U.S. border in the Saint Lawrence River.

Thousand Islands may also refer to:

Places

Islands
Thousand Islands (Indonesia), a chain of islands in Jakarta, Indonesia
Thousand Islands, Cocoa Beach, a group of islands in Cocoa Beach, Florida, United States
Thousand Islands (Svalbard), a group of islands south of Edge Island, part of the Svalbard archipelago. 
Kuril Islands, in Russia's Sakhalin Oblast region

Other places
Rivière des Mille Îles (Thousand Islands River), a river channel off Montreal in Quebec, Canada
Qiandao Lake, (Thousand Islands Lake), in Zhejiang, China
Thousand Island Lake, lake in Madera County, California, United States

Other uses
Thousand Island dressing, a salad dressing
 Thousand Islands Bridge, a bridge between Ontario, Canada and New York, US

See also 

 Mille-Îles (disambiguation)